George Barbier may refer to:

 George Barbier (illustrator) (1882–1932), French illustrator
 George Barbier (actor) (1864–1945), American actor